Cwenthryth (also Quendreda) was a princess of Mercia, an Anglo-Saxon kingdom in central England, who lived in the early 9th century.

She was the daughter of Coenwulf of Mercia and the sister of Saint Kenelm and also the sister of Burgenilda. Roger of Wendover names "Quendridam et Burgenildam" as the daughters of Kenulfus. And William of Malmesbury identifies "Quendrida" as the older sister of St Kenelm. In 811 she subscribed a charter (S 165) of King Coenwulf of Mercia to Beornmod, Bishop of Rochester, in which she is identified as "Quoenðryð filia regis", Quendreda the king's daughter.

After Coenwulf's death, his son was killed fighting the Welsh, possibly due to Cwenthryth's treachery.

Cwenthryth was also the Abbess of Minster-in-Thanet who inherited property and authority from Coenwulf. Wulfred, Archbishop of Canterbury, challenged her for the authority over her abbey estates. She was ultimately compelled to resign.

References

External links
 

Anglo-Saxon abbesses
Anglo-Saxon royalty
9th-century deaths
Year of birth unknown
Mercian people
English princesses
9th-century English women
9th-century English people
People from Minster-in-Thanet